Nemanja Gavrić (born 20 October 2003) is a Slovenian footballer who plays for NK Olimpija Ljubljana as a midfielder.

Career statistics

Club

References

2003 births
Living people
Slovenian footballers
Slovenia youth international footballers
Association football midfielders
Slovenian PrvaLiga players
Slovenian Second League players
NK Olimpija Ljubljana (2005) players
NK Krško players